Josef Schößwendter (born 14 January 1966) is an Austrian para-alpine skier. He represented Austria at three Winter Paralympics: in 1998, 2002 and 2006.

In 2002 he won the silver medal in the Men's Super-G LW4 event.

See also 
 List of Paralympic medalists in alpine skiing

References 

Living people
1966 births
Paralympic alpine skiers of Austria
Austrian male alpine skiers
Alpine skiers at the 2002 Winter Paralympics
Alpine skiers at the 2006 Winter Paralympics
Alpine skiers at the 2010 Winter Paralympics
Medalists at the 2002 Winter Paralympics
Paralympic silver medalists for Austria
Paralympic medalists in alpine skiing